Night of a Thousand Candles is the first studio album by the band The Men They Couldn't Hang. It was released in 1985 on vinyl and cassette format, and then on CD format in 1987. The cassette version has two additional tracks, and the CD version has six bonus tracks added. Tracks from the album were performed before its release during the John Peel sessions on July 14, 1984, and January 22, 1985. Their cover version of Eric Bogle's, "The Green Fields of France" reached number 3 on John Peel's festive 50 in 1984 and  "Ironmasters", the second single from the album, reached number 11 in 1985. The album also came 10th on Melody Maker's End Of Year Critic Lists 1985.

Personnel

The Men They Couldn't Hang
 Shanne Bradley - bass guitar, Tibetan anus flute
 Stefan Cush (a.k.a. Cush) – vocals, guitar
 Jon Odgers – drums, percussion
 Philip Odgers (a.k.a. Swill) – vocals, guitar, tinwhistle, melodica
 Paul Simmonds - guitar, bouzuki, keyboards

Additional musicians
 Tom Keane – Bagpipes, Uilleann Pipes
 Lindsey Lowe – trumpet

Production
 Harold Burgen – Tracks 12 & 13
 Nick Lowe – Track 11
 Philip Chevron - Tracks 4, 5, 6, 10 & 14
 Tony Poole - Tracks 1, 2, 3, 7, 8, 9, 16
Engineer
 Nick Robbins 
Photography
 David Howell

Track listing

References

1985 debut albums
The Men They Couldn't Hang albums
Albums produced by Nick Lowe